Hardee may refer to:

Hardee (surname)
Hardee County, Florida
Hardee's, American fast-food restaurant chain
 Hardee hat, popularly worn during the American Civil War by Union Army enlisted men

See also
Hardy (disambiguation)